The 1872 United States presidential election in Massachusetts took place on November 5, 1872. All contemporary 37 states were part of the 1872 United States presidential election. The state voters chose 13 electors to the Electoral College, which selected the president and vice president.

Massachusetts was won by the Republican nominees, incumbent President Ulysses S. Grant of Illinois and his running mate Senator Henry Wilson of Massachusetts. Grant and Wilson defeated the Liberal Republican and Democratic nominees, former Congressman Horace Greeley of New York and his running mate former Senator and Governor Benjamin Gratz Brown of Missouri by a margin of 38.51%.

With 69.20% of the popular vote, Massachusetts would be Grant's fifth strongest victory in terms of percentage in the popular vote after Vermont, South Carolina, Rhode Island and Nebraska.

Results

See also
 United States presidential elections in Massachusetts

References

Massachusetts
1872
1872 Massachusetts elections